Thomas Hayes (1840 – May 24, 1914) was a United States Navy sailor and a recipient of America's highest military decoration, the Medal of Honor, for his actions during the Battle of Mobile Bay in the American Civil War.

Medal of Honor citation
Rank and Organization: Coxswain, U.S. Navy. Born: 1840, Rhode Island. Accredited To: Rhode Island. G.O. No.: 45, 31 December 1864.

Citation:

Cool and courageous at his station throughout the prolonged action, Hayes maintained fire from his gun on Fort Morgan and on ships of the Confederacy despite extremely heavy return fire.

See also
List of Medal of Honor recipients
Battle of Mobile Bay

Notes

References

External links

United States Navy Medal of Honor recipients
Union Navy sailors
People of Rhode Island in the American Civil War
1840 births
1914 deaths
American Civil War recipients of the Medal of Honor